Capital punishment in Georgia may refer to:

 Capital punishment in Georgia (country)
 Capital punishment in Georgia (U.S. state)